Danika Priim (born 11 September 1984) is a retired rugby league player from Leeds.  She has previously played for Stanningley and Bradford Bulls Women before playing for her home town team, Leeds Rhinos Women in the Women's Super League between 2018 and 2021. Priim played at prop forward. Priim has played at international level for  since 2015 with her last international appearance being in 2018.

Born in Leeds, Priim studied PE and qualified as a teacher at Leeds Beckett University. She played rugby union for the university and did not return to rugby league until 2015 when she joined Stanningley.

In 2017 Priim moved to Bradford Bulls for the inaugural Women's Super League season and was a member of the squad that won both the league title and the Challenge Cup although she missed the Challenge Cup Final due to injury and was asked not to play in the 
Super League Grand Final to ensure she was fit to play for England in the 2017 Women's Rugby League World Cup.  Selected by England for the 2017 World Cup Priim had to take several weeks unpaid leave from her teaching post as England reached the semi-finals.

The following year Priim left Bradford to join the newly-formed Leeds Rhinos where she was appointed vice-captain.  In their first season Leeds made both the Grand Final and the Challenge Cup final but an anterior cruciate ligament injury meant Priim missed both big games.  An appearance in a major final finally came when she played in the Rhinos successful retention of the Challenge Cup against Castleford in July 2019. The season ended with her second major final appearance as Leeds lifted the Super League trophy beating Castleford in the Grand Final.

Priim played her last game for Leeds in the defeat to St Helens in the 2021 Grand Final and announced her retirement from playing the following week.

Since 2020 Priim has appeared as a commentator and summarizer on both Sky TV and BBC TV and radio.

References

1984 births
Living people
Alumni of Leeds Beckett University
England women's national rugby league team players
English female rugby league players
Leeds Rhinos Women players
English rugby league commentators
Rugby league players from Leeds
Rugby league props